The UK Holiday Group Ltd. or simply referred to as UKHG is a British privately owned package holiday company based in Norwich, United Kingdom specialising in holidays for elderly couples.

History 

The group was founded in 1983 by Paul Bennett when he was 23 with his £500 life savings.

The coaches subsidiary Glenton was launched in 2005 by Steve Turbill, Harriet Stamp and Paul Bennett.

In 2010, the year it purchased the Daunceys Hotel in Weston-Super-Mare, the group's sales rose 11% to £26 million with 100,000 annual visitors.

In November 2012, the group bought the bookings of the defunct Bowen Travel Group (coaches).

In March 2012, the group closed down the Warwick Hotel in Blackpool. In October 2014, the group announced its intention to demolish the Mount Sorrel Hotel in Barry, and build houses on the lot instead  (the hotel was revived in 2016 when a new owner bought it). In 2018, the group sold two of its hotels: the Historic Lake District hotel in Kendal for £975k, and the historic Daunceys Hotel in Somerset for £995,000.

Description 

Each year, the hotel group welcomes more than 250,000 overnight guests.

Subsidiaries 

 Grand UK Hotels: 6 hotels
 Grand UK Holidays: Cruises, coach tours, holidays by air and rail tours
 Sunrise Direct: Coach tours and cruises
 Glenton Holidays: Based in Glasgow, Scotland. Coach tours and cruises during Scottish holidays.
 Anglia Hosts: Standalone subsidiary that manages the Best Western George Hotel Swaffham, Norfolk, purchased in 2013

Locations 
The group operate 9 hotels throughout England and Wales. Eight are traded under Grand UK Hotels, one under Anglia Hosts

References

 
Hotel and leisure companies of the United Kingdom
Companies based in Norwich
Hotel chains in the United Kingdom
Hotels established in 1983
Privately held companies of England
1983 establishments in England